Jacob Akanyirige (born December 30, 2001) is an American professional soccer player who plays as a right back for New England Revolution II in MLS Next Pro.

Career

Youth 
Akanyirige played for Pleasanton, CA's Ballistic United SC during the 2015–2016 season for their U.S. Soccer Developmental Academy's Under 13/14 team. In 2016–2017, he joined San Jose's U-15 squad and quickly moved up the academy ranks. After making one appearance for the U-17 side in 2017-18, he moved up to the U-19s and was competing against players two and three years older than him. Akanyirige's birthday makes him a unique prospect for the youth national teams as he is two days too old to play with the 2002 cycle and is the youngest, or among the youngest, in 2001.

Professional

San Jose Earthquakes
Akanyirige signed as San Jose's fourth ever Homegrown Player on December 15, 2017. At the time of his signing, he was the youngest player to sign for the Earthquakes as well as third-youngest player in MLS, and the eighth-youngest to ever sign a professional contract in MLS history. Following the 2021 season, San Jose declined their contract option on Akanyirige.

Rochester NY FC
Akanyirige Signed with Rochester New York FC on April 2, 2022 on a free transfer. Akanyridge debuted for Rochester during an U.S. Open Cup match against FC Motown. Akanyirige scored his first professional goal on 5/14/22 in a match against Inter Miami II.

International career
Born in the United States, Akanyirige is of Ghanaian descent. He is a youth international for the United States.

Statistics
Updated September 25, 2022

Notes

References

External links
 
 
 Jacob Aknayirige at MLS Next Pro

2001 births
Living people
American sportspeople of Ghanaian descent
American soccer players
United States men's youth international soccer players
Association football defenders
Homegrown Players (MLS)
People from Pleasanton, California
Reno 1868 FC players
Rochester New York FC players
San Jose Earthquakes players
Soccer players from California
Sportspeople from Alameda County, California
USL Championship players
Major League Soccer players
MLS Next Pro players